Dr. P. Pookunhikoya (born 1 January 1949) was a member of the 14th Lok Sabha of India. He represented the Lakshadweep constituency as a member of the JD(U)   political party.

References

External links
 Official biographical sketch in Parliament of India website

1949 births
Living people
India MPs 2004–2009
Janata Dal (United) politicians
Lok Sabha members from Lakshadweep
People from Lakshadweep district
Nationalist Congress Party politicians from Lakshadweep
Samata Party politicians